"Forget Him" is a Cantonese pop song written by Hong Kong media personality James Wong. It was originally sung by Teresa Teng and was included in her first Cantonese album, Sai Bat Leung Laap (1980).

Fifteen years later, the song was covered by Shirley Kwan, as part of her 1995 tribute album 'EX' All Time Favourites. This new Dream pop version was featured in Wong Kar-wai's art house movie Fallen Angels (1995) as the Jukebox song number "1818." As the title suggested, the hitman played by Leon Lai wanted his accomplice, Michelle Reis, to forget him.

References

1980 songs
Teresa Teng songs
Shirley Kwan songs
Songs with lyrics by James Wong (lyricist)
Cantonese-language songs
Cantopop songs